ORF7a (also known by several other names, including SARS coronavirus X4, SARS-X4, ORF7a, or U122) is a gene found in coronaviruses of the Betacoronavirus genus. It expresses the Betacoronavirus NS7A protein, a type I transmembrane protein with an immunoglobulin-like protein domain. It was first discovered in SARS-CoV, the virus that causes severe acute respiratory syndrome (SARS). The homolog in SARS-CoV-2, the virus that causes COVID-19, has about 85% sequence identity to the SARS-CoV protein.

Function
A number of possible functions for the ORF7a protein have been described. The primary function is thought to be immunomodulation and interferon antagonism. The protein is not essential for viral replication.

Viral protein interactions
Studies in SARS-CoV suggest that the protein forms protein-protein interactions with spike protein and ORF3a, and is present in mature virions, making it a minor viral structural protein. It is unclear if this occurs in SARS-CoV-2. It may have a role in viral assembly.

Host effects
A number of interactions with host proteins and effects on host cell processes have been described. The SARS-CoV ORF7a protein has been reported to have binding activity to integrin I domains. 

It has also been reported to induce apoptosis via a caspase dependent
pathway. Also, it contains a motif which has been demonstrated to mediate COPII dependent transport out of the endoplasmic reticulum, and the protein is targeted to the Golgi apparatus.

In SARS-CoV-2, ORF7a protein has been described as an effective interferon antagonist. The SARS-CoV-2 protein may have immunomodulatory effects through interaction with monocytes.

Structure
The ORF7a protein is a transmembrane protein with 121 amino acid residues in SARS-CoV-2 and 122 in SARS-CoV. It is a type I transmembrane protein with an N-terminal signal peptide, an ectodomain that has an immunoglobulin fold, and a C-terminal endoplasmic reticulum retention signal sequence. The structure contains seven beta strands which form two beta sheets, arranged in a beta sandwich. Most of the sequence differences between SARS-CoV and SARS-CoV-2 occur in the Ig-like ectodomain and may produce differences in protein-protein interactions.

Post-translational modifications
The SARS-CoV-2 ORF7a protein has been reported to be post-translationally modified by ubiquitination. Polyubiquitin chains attached to lysine 119 may be related to the protein's reported interferon antagonism.

Expression and localization

Along with the genes for other viral accessory proteins, the ORF7a gene is located near those encoding the viral structural proteins, at the 5' end of the coronavirus RNA genome. ORF7a is an overlapping gene that overlaps ORF7b. In SARS-CoV, subcellular localization to the endoplasmic reticulum, Golgi apparatus, and ERGIC has been reported, with similar Golgi localization described for SARS-CoV-2.

Evolution

It is thought that ORF8 in SARS-CoV-2, which encodes a protein with a similar Ig-like fold, may be a paralog of ORF7a that originated through gene duplication, though some bioinformatics analyses suggest the similarity may be too low to support duplication, which is relatively uncommon in viruses. Immunoglobulin domains are uncommon in coronaviruses; other than the subset of betacoronaviruses with ORF8 and ORF7a, only a small number of bat alphacoronaviruses have been identified as containing likely Ig domains, while they are absent from gammacoronaviruses and deltacoronaviruses. The beta and alpha Ig domains may be independent acquisitions, where ORF8 and ORF7a may have been acquired from host proteins.

Many SARS-CoV-2 genomes have been sequenced throughout the COVID-19 pandemic and a number of variations have been reported, including deletion mutations, nonsense mutations (introducing a premature stop codon and truncating the protein), and at least one gene fusion.

References

Protein domains
Coronavirus proteins